Lophocampa puertoricensis is a moth of the family Erebidae. It was described by Vincent in 2009. It is found in Puerto Rico.

References

Moths described in 2009
puertoricensis
Moths of the Caribbean